Sir Leslie Wilson Johnson,  (2 April 1916 – 31 August 2000) was an Australian public servant and diplomat.

Career
Johnson first went to Papua New Guinea in 1962. From 1966 to 1969, he was Assistant Administrator in Papua and New Guinea. He resigned in 1969 after internal differences with colleagues, before being appointed Administrator of Papua New Guinea in 1970. His task was to develop a colonial Administrator's council into a cabinet in preparation for Papua New Guinea's independence.

On 1 December 1973, after 60 years of Papua New Guinea being a territory of Australia, Johnson's role changed from the Administrator of Papua New Guinea to the Australian High Commissioner to Papua New Guinea. Johnson left Papua New Guinea in March 1974, to take up a post as the head of the new Australian Development Assistance Agency. The agency was set up in recognition of the need for stronger policy direction and coordination, along with Papua New Guinea achieving independence. In the mid 1970s, two-thirds of Australian total overseas aid was sent to Papua New Guinea.

From June 1976 to 1980, Johnson was Australian Ambassador to Greece and the non-resident High Commissioner to Cyprus.

In the 1976 Queen's Birthday Honours, Johnson was made a Commander of the Order of the British Empire in recognition of his distinguished services to Papua New Guinea. In the Papua New Guinea 2000 Queen's Birthday Honours he was made a Knight Commander of the Order of the British Empire.

Johnson died on 31 August 2000.

References

|-

1916 births
2000 deaths
Ambassadors of Australia to Greece
High Commissioners of Australia to Cyprus
Australian Army personnel of World War II
Australian Knights Commander of the Order of the British Empire
Australian public servants
High Commissioners of Australia to Papua New Guinea
People from Tambellup, Western Australia